Horia Colibășanu (born 4 January 1977, in Timișoara) is a Romanian mountain climber. He is the first Romanian to reach the summits of K2, Manaslu, Dhaulagiri, Annapurna and Kangchenjunga. He climbed ten of the most difficult peaks in the world, above 8,000 m. In 2009 Horia received the “Spirit of Mountaineering” award for his role in the rescue operation of Iñaki Ochoa de Olza.

8000 m+ mountains summited 

 2004: K2 (8.611 m) – first Romanian ascent, without bottled oxygen
 2006: Manaslu (8.163 m) – first Romanian ascent, without bottled oxygen
 2007: Dhaulagiri (8.167 m) – first Romanian ascent, without bottled oxygen
 2009: Shishapangma Central Summit (8.013 m) - without bottled oxygen
 2010: Annapurna (8.091 m) - first Romanian ascent, without bottled oxygen
 2011: Makalu (8.481 m) - without bottled oxygen
 2013: Lhotse (8516 m) - first Romanian ascent, without bottled oxygen
 2014: Shishapangma Main Summit (8.027 m) - without bottled oxygen
 2017: Everest (8.848 m) - first Romanian ascent without bottled oxygen
 2022: Kangchenjunga (8586 m) - first Romanian ascent, without bottled oxygen

Other notable ascents 

 1998: Gumachi (3.805 m), Elbrus (5.642 m)
 1999: Khan Tengri (7.010 m)
 2002: Elbrus (5.648 m)
 2003: Matterhorn (4.462 m) – via Lion ridge – Italy

References

External links
 Outstanding article "The Survivor" on Romanian Career Magazine 
 Horia talks about the preparations for his 2006 Manaslu expedition

1977 births
Living people
Sportspeople from Timișoara
Romanian mountain climbers